You Cannot Kill David Arquette is a 2020 American documentary film, directed by David Darg and Price James. It follows David Arquette attempting to return to wrestling after his acting career stalls.

It was released on August 21, 2020, by Super LTD.

Synopsis
David Arquette attempts a return to wrestling, which stalled his acting career.

Cast
 David Arquette
 Patricia Arquette
 Rosanna Arquette
 Richmond Arquette
 Courteney Cox
 Ric Flair
 Mick Foley
 Eric Bischoff
 Peter Avalon
 Diamond Dallas Page

Production
In December 2019, it was announced David Darg and Price James had directed a documentary film following David Arquette, over the course of two years, with Patricia Arquette, Rosanna Arquette, Richmond Arquette, Courteney Cox, and Ric Flair set to appear in the film.

Release
The film was scheduled to have its world premiere at South by Southwest on March 20, 2020. The festival was cancelled due to the COVID-19 pandemic. Shortly after, Super LTD acquired distribution rights to the film. It was released to drive-in theatres on August 21, 2020, and via digital platforms and on-demand on August 28.

Reception 
The site's critical consensus reads, "You Cannot Kill David Arquette -- nor can you deny the sheer watchability of this unusual and surprisingly affecting documentary."

Owen Gleiberman gave a positive review for Variety and complimented how the film handles the merger between kayfabe in professional wrestling and reality: "At the end of You Cannot Kill David Arquette, we’re drawn into a wrestling narrative that the documentary wants you to believe, even as it stands on the outside looking in. Is Arquette a has-been actor trumping up his biggest failure so that he can exploit it? Or is he a lionhearted wrestler who finds triumph by going the distance? The weird thing is that there’s no difference."

For Film Pulse, Adam Patterson gave a generally positive review, but pondered if Arquette could be well received by the audience as an underdog: "This [...] may be a hard pill to swallow for some, considering he has had a seemingly successful career, lives in a beautiful home and has a family who cares for him deeply."

References

External links
 

2020 films
2020 documentary films
American sports documentary films
Documentary films about sportspeople
Documentary films about actors
Films postponed due to the COVID-19 pandemic
Professional wrestling documentary films
2020s English-language films
2020s American films